Henri Joseph Marcel Gilardoni (28 January 1876 – 21 May 1937) was a French sailor who competed in the 1900 Summer Olympics in Paris, France. Gilardoni took the gold in the 1st race of the 3 to 10 ton.

References

External links

 

French male sailors (sport)
Sailors at the 1900 Summer Olympics – 3 to 10 ton
Olympic sailors of France
1876 births
1937 deaths
Olympic gold medalists for France
Olympic medalists in sailing
Medalists at the 1900 Summer Olympics
Sailors at the 1900 Summer Olympics – Open class
Sportspeople from Paris
20th-century French people